Square One Mall is a shopping mall located along US Route 1 (Broadway) between Main Street and Essex Street in Saugus, Massachusetts. Anchor stores are Macy's, Dick's Sporting Goods, Best Buy and TJ Maxx. Additional stores in the mall include Old Navy, Forever 21, Famous Footwear, EbLens, and Bath & Body Works.

The mall was a $100 million project undertaken by New England Development Corporation to redevelop the former New England Shopping Center which consisted of Sears, Service Merchandise and the former General Cinemas which had closed in the mid-1980s.  The construction of the mall was unique since it incorporated the previously built structure of Sears, signs of this being the difference in building materials between Sears and the rest of the mall. The mall opened for business on August 17, 1994.

The mall is credited with bringing sprawl and strip development to Saugus, especially along the Route 1 corridor.

Filene's Basement, one of the malls former anchors, filed for bankruptcy protection on May 4, 2009.  New York’s Crown Acquisitions, made a bid to buy Filene's Basement including their famous Downtown Crossing location which closed in 2007. All Filene's Basement stores closed in December 2011.

TJ Maxx was originally in a space built for Lechmere, but has since moved to a space formerly occupied by Filene's Basement.

In 2015, Sears Holdings spun off 235 of its properties, including the Sears at Square One Mall, into Seritage Growth Properties. Sears downsized its store to the lower level in 2017. The upper level of Sears is now vacant. On June 30, 2020, it was announced that Sears would be closing as part of a plan to close 28 stores nationwide. The store closed on September 13, 2020.

Bus connections
Along with a large parking lot, the MBTA services the Square One Mall with the following MBTA bus routes:
429 Northgate Shopping Center - Lynn Commuter Rail Station via Jefferson Ave & Square One Mall
430 Saugus Center - Malden Station via Square One Mall

The 131 has been proposed to be extended from its current route between Malden and Melrose to the Square One Mall. As of now Melrose residents can only access the mall by car or by taking a bus in the opposite direction to Malden Station and then transferring to the 430.

References

Simon Property Group
Shopping malls in Massachusetts
Buildings and structures in Saugus, Massachusetts
Tourist attractions in Essex County, Massachusetts
Shopping malls established in 1994
1994 establishments in Massachusetts